Helicella is a genus of small to medium-sized, air-breathing land snails, terrestrial pulmonate gastropod mollusks in the subfamily Helicellinae of the family Geomitridae, the hairy snails and their allies.

Species
Species within the genus Helicella include:
 Helicella bolenensis (Locard, 1882)
 Helicella candoni Thach, 2018
 Helicella cistorum (Morelet, 1845)
 Helicella iberica (Rambur, 1869)
 Helicella itala (Linnaeus, 1758) - type species
 Helicella juglans (Gittenberger, 1991)
 Helicella nubigena (Saulcy, 1852)
 Helicella ordunensis (Kobelt, 1883)
 Helicella orzai (Gittenberger & Manga, 1981)
 Helicella sabulivaga (Mabille, 1881)
 Helicella stiparum (Rossmässler, 1854)
 † Helicella striataformis (Lörenthey, 1906) 
 Helicella striatitala Prieto, 1985
 Helicella valdeona (Gittenberger & Manga, 1977)
Synonyms
 Helicella arcadiana Schileyko, 1967: synonym of Kalitinaia arcadiana (Schileyko, 1967) (original combination)
 Helicella barcinensis (Bourguignat, 1868): synonym of Xerotricha barcinensis (Bourguignat, 1868) (superseded combination)
 Helicella bierzonaE. Gittenberger & Manga, 1977: synonym for Xerotricha bierzona (Gittenberger & Manga, 1977)
 Helicella cobosi Ortiz de Zárate López, 1962: synonym of Xerocrassa cobosi (Ortiz de Zárate López, 1962) (original combination)
 Helicella corderoi E. Gittenberger & Manga, 1977: synonym of Xerotricha corderoi (E. Gittenberger & Manga, 1977) (original combination)
 Helicella depulsa L. Pintér, 1969: synonym of Xerolenta depulsa (L. Pintér, 1969) (superseded combination, basionym)
 Helicella erjaveci Brusina, 1870: synonym of Vitrea erjaveci (Brusina, 1870) (original combination)
 Helicella frater (Dohrn & Heynemann, 1862): synonym of Xerocrassa frater (Dohrn & Heynemann, 1862) (chresonym)
 Helicella gasulli: synonym for Xerotricha gasulli (Ortiz de Zarate, 1950)
 Helicella jamuzensis E. Gittenberger & Manga, 1977: synonym of Xerotricha jamuzensis (E. Gittenberger & Manga, 1977) (original combination)
 Helicella macedonica P. Hesse, 1928: synonym of Xerolenta macedonica (P. Hesse, 1928) (original combination)
 Helicella mangae E. Gittenberger & Raven, 1982: synonym of Xerotricha gonzalezi (Azpeitia, 1925)
 Helicella mariae:synonym for Xerotricha mariae (Gasull, 1972)
 Helicella mayeri Gude, 1914: synonym of Microxeromagna lowei (Potiez & Michaud, 1838) (junior synonym)
 Helicella nitida (O. F. Müller, 1774): synonym of Zonitoides nitidus (O. F. Müller, 1774) (superseded combination)
 Helicella obvia (Menke, 1828): synonym of Xerolenta obvia (Menke, 1828)(superseded combination)
 Helicella paul-hessei Lindholm, 1936: synonym of Helicopsis paulhessei (Lindholm, 1936): synonym of Helicopsis filimargo filimargo (Krynicki, 18 33): synonym of Helicopsis filimargo (Krynicki, 1833) (original combination)
 †Helicella phrygostriata (Oppenheim, 1919): synonym of † Helicopsis phrygostriata (Oppenheim, 1919) 
 Helicella rhabdotoides (A. J. Wagner, 1928) synonym of Candidula rhabdotoides (A. J. Wagner, 1928) (invalid combination)
 Helicella seetzeni (L. Pfeiffer, 1847): synonym of Xerocrassa seetzeni (L. Pfeiffer, 1847)
 Helicella spiruloides A. J. Wagner in Hesse, 1916: synonym of Xerolenta spiruloides (A. J. Wagner, 1916) (original combination)
 Helicella syrensis (L. Pfeiffer, 1846): synonym of Candidula syrensis (L. Pfeiffer, 1846) (superseded combination)
 Helicella tumulorum (Webb & Berthelot, 1833): synonym of Monilearia tumulorum (Webb & Berthelot, 1833) (chresonym)
 Helicella turolensis Ortiz de Zárate López, 1963: synonym of Xerocrassa turolensis (Ortiz de Zárate López, 1963) (original combination)
 Helicella virgata (da Costa, 1778): synonym of Cernuella virgata (Da Costa, 1778) (superseded generic combination)
 Helicella zaratei: synonym for Xerotricha zaratei (Gittenberger & Manga, 1977)
 Helicella zujarensis: synonym for Xerotricha zujarensis (Ortiz de Zarate, 1950)
Taxa inquirenda
 Helicella hamacenica (Bourguignat, 1883))
 †  Helicella libidinosa Steklov, 1966 
 Helicella subnivellina (Bourguignat, 1883)
 †  Helicella sunzhica Steklov, 1966

References

 Vaught, K.C.; Tucker Abbott, R.; Boss, K.J. (1989). A classification of the living Mollusca. American Malacologists: Melbourne. . XII, 195 pp.

External links
 Férussac, A. E. J. P. F. d'Audebard de. (1821-1822). Tableaux systématiques des animaux mollusques classés en familles naturelles, dans lesquels on a établi la concordance de tous les systèmes; suivis d'un Prodrome général pour tous les mollusques ou fluviatiles, vivantes ou fossiles. Paris, 1821 et 1822
 Monterosato, T. A. di. (1892). Molluschi terrestri delle isole adiacenti alla Sicilia. Atti della Reale Accademia di Scienze, Lettere e Belle Arti di Palermo. 3rd Series, 2: 1-34

 
Gastropod genera
Taxonomy articles created by Polbot